Del Mar Heights is a census-designated place (CDP) in Cameron County, Texas, United States. The population was 113 at the 2010 census. It is part of the Brownsville–Harlingen Metropolitan Statistical Area.

Geography

Demographics
As of the census of 2000, there were 259 people, 61 households, and 53 families residing in the CDP. The population density was 658.0 people per square mile (256.4/km2). There were 81 housing units at an average density of 205.8/sq mi (80.2/km2). The racial makeup of the CDP was 74.90% White, 3.09% African American, 20.46% from other races, and 1.54% from two or more races. Hispanic or Latino of any race were 96.53% of the population.

There were 61 households, out of which 63.9% had children under the age of 18 living with them, 59.0% were married couples living together, 27.9% had a female householder with no husband present, and 11.5% were non-families. 11.5% of all households were made up of individuals, and 4.9% had someone living alone who was 65 years of age or older. The average household size was 4.25 and the average family size was 4.63.

In the CDP, the population was spread out, with 45.6% under the age of 18, 10.4% from 18 to 24, 27.8% from 25 to 44, 10.0% from 45 to 64, and 6.2% who were 65 years of age or older. The median age was 20 years. For every 100 females, there were 107.2 males. For every 100 females age 18 and over, there were 90.5 males.

The median income for a household in the CDP was $13,229, and the median income for a family was $15,714. Males had a median income of $11,818 versus $0 for females. The per capita income for the CDP was $3,665. About 60.4% of families and 66.9% of the population were below the poverty line, including 81.2% of those under the age of 18 and none of those 65 or over.

Education
Del Mar Heights is served by the Los Fresnos Consolidated Independent School District.

In addition, South Texas Independent School District operates magnet schools that serve the community.

References

Census-designated places in Cameron County, Texas
Census-designated places in Texas